Vitrina pellucida is species of small land snail, a terrestrial pulmonate gastropod mollusk in the family Vitrinidae, the glass snails.

Description

This species is a 'semi-slug' with a flattened, globular shell. The animal is pale grey with darker head and tentacles. It is large in comparison with the shell, and cannot completely retreat into it. The shell is subglobose, somewhat smooth, pellucid and greenish hyaline in colour. The shell has 3 whorls that enlarge rapidly and are somewhat convex. The body whorl is wide and a little flattened below. The suture is wrinkled. The aperture is lunately rounded. The umbilicus is very small.

The width of the shell is 6 mm, the height is 3.5 mm.

Distribution 
This species is known to occur in a number of countries and islands in Western Europe and Central Europe, including:

 Bulgaria
 Czech Republic
 Netherlands
 Poland
 Slovakia
 Ukraine
 Great Britain
 Ireland
 and other areas

Ecology 
Predators: This snail is eaten by hedgehogs.

Food: This species eats liverworts (Jungermanniaceae) and decayed leaves. It will also eat dead earthworms and horse manure.

Habitat: These snails live in moist and shady places, but are not usually observed until late in the autumn. These snails occur both in natural and modified habitats, such as in meadows and grasslands, in deciduous and coniferous forests, and in wasteground.

Eggs: The eggs are deposited in small heaps, and have a membraneous covering.

Parasites of Vitrina pellucida include:
 Elaphostrongylus spp.

References
This article incorporates public domain text from the reference

External links

 Vitrina pellucida at Animalbase taxonomy,short description, distribution, biology, status (threats), images

Vitrinidae
Molluscs of Europe
Gastropods described in 1774
Taxa named by Otto Friedrich Müller